Mavranaioi is a village and a community of the Grevena municipality. Before the 2011 local government reform it was a part of the municipality of Theodoros Ziakas, of which it was a municipal district and the seat. The 2011 census recorded 159 residents in the village and 289 residents in the community. The community of Mavranaioi covers an area of 37.934 km2.

Administrative division
The community of Mavranaioi consists of three separate settlements: 
Mavranaioi (population 159)
Mavronoros (population 78)
Stavros (population 52)
The aforementioned population figures are as of 2011.

History
From Mavranaious came the Abbot of the Monis Spilaion. Said to have named the Turkish occupation, when the Turks took the children of the village and made janissaries and residents commiserating these, named them "black youth" (i.e. the hapless youth).

Much interest is the central church, which is dedicated to St. Dimitrios. The temple bears the date of incorporation (1818), and save icons, icons and relics. Few images are preserved in the chapel of St. Athanasius and St. Kitts. According to oral tradition, the chapel of the Virgin was built in memory of his mother a janissary, who financed the construction. Burned by the Germans and rebuilt in 1960. Paliomonastiro in position, close to Notre Mavranaioi, were columns, mosaics and fragments of clay pots. Mavronoros found in the church of St. Theodore (1806) with frescoes from the 19th century. and the church of Agia Kyriaki (1704), the oldest church of Grevena, now on maintenance and restoration is well maintained, even in Mavronoros and 3 km south east, is the chapel of Trinity, formerly monastery.

Important churches Cross of the Assumption (1890) 500 MD of the village of Agios Nikolaos, Monemvasia with the stone fountain. Other such taps is "Tsekliza" and "Ekklisias Pigadi" in Mavranaioi and "Kara Pigadi" in Mavronoros. The Community Cultural Associations organized by the revival of the traditions of the Light of Rogkatsarion carnival and events with dancing and celebrations center on Christmas and Carnival.

The Easter dance of the chapels in Easter songs, while Sunday after Easter is repeated in Agia Triada and the Mavronoros Ag.Pnefmatos in the village. The biggest festival of Mafranaion takes place the night of August, with high jinks in the courtyard of the Community Office, accompanied by traditional musical instruments and the participation of many visitors.

Geography
Mavranaioi is the first village on the road to the ski resort Vassilitsa at an altitude of 770 m, located about 13 km from Grevena and 19 km from Avdella.. Remarkable natural monument area is the river Venetikos, which is accessible by paved road south-south east. Mavranaioi of which leads to Pigaditsa. Also south east of Mavranaioi constructed geofragma where formed beautiful lake, about 15 m deep. Suitable for hiking and recreation are the peaks of the region "Tabouri-Glykomeli (920 m) between Mavranaioi-Stauros," Emorfi-Rahi (850 m) 3.5 km south and "Antan" (850 m) 2.5 km south of Mavronoros. Forest oak and black pine covers portions of Mavranaioi. The location "Perdika" between Mavranaioi and Mavronoros, rumored that took its name from the namesake of general Philip.

See also
 List of settlements in the Grevena regional unit

References

Populated places in Grevena (regional unit)